Alex Paterson (also known as Dr Alex Paterson, born Duncan Alexander Robert Paterson; 15 October 1959 in Battersea, London) is an English musician and co-founder of ambient house group The Orb, in which he has worked since its inception.

Life and work
Paterson attended Kingham Hill School in Oxfordshire between 1970 and 1979, at the same time as Killing Joke bassist Martin "Youth" Glover. Paterson was a roadie for Killing Joke in the 1980s and later worked in the A&R department of E.G. Records, to whom the band were signed. 

New York radio stations were a force driving his musical direction, especially the Chuck Chill-Out shows on 98.7 KISS FM. In the late 1970s Paterson sang for the band 'Bloodsport' while also DJing at Killing Joke gigs.

In 1989, Youth and Alex Paterson started the WAU! Mr. Modo label. Their early releases of a selection of industrial techno dubs and heavy sound system dubs from artists such as Napthali, Manasseh, Bim Sherman and Jah Warrior are long deleted and fetch high sums in private sales.

In 1990, Paterson's collaborations with his fellow Orb co-founder Jimmy Cauty ended, following Paterson's concerns about The Orb being perceived as a side-project of The KLF. Paterson retained The Orb name. More recently, Cauty and Paterson collaborated again, as Transit Kings. Paterson was also involved in FFWD, a collaboration with Kris Weston, Robert Fripp, and Thomas Fehlmann, and SCREEN alongside music producer Gaudi. 

In 2021 Paterson started his own record label, Orbscure Recordings.

References

Sources

External links
Alex Paterson discusses his vinyl collection on BBC radio

1959 births
Living people
The Orb members
English electronic musicians
Paterson, Alex
Road crew
People from Battersea
People educated at Kingham Hill School
Record collectors